Lane v Shire Roofing Co (Oxford) Ltd [1995] EWCA Civ 37 is a UK labour law case concerning the scope of protection for people to employment rights. It took the view that for an employment contract to exist, the employee must be integrated in the business.

Facts
A building worker was hired by Shire Roofing to do jobs paid by the day, which was considered ‘prudent and advantageous to hire for individual jobs’. Mr Lane fell and was injured.

Judgment
In the High Court the judge found that Mr Lane was an independent contractor.

In the Court of Appeal, however, it was held by Henry LJ that, in relation to the porch job, this was the company’s business and not Mr Lane’s:

See also

Contract of employment in English law
UK labour law
EU labour law
US labor law
German labour law

Notes

References

United Kingdom labour case law
Court of Appeal (England and Wales) cases
1995 in case law
1995 in British law